President François Bozizé has said that one of his priorities is to get the support of the international community. This has indeed been visible in his relations to donor countries and international organisations. At the same time it is difficult to have an open policy towards neighbouring countries when they are used as safe haven by rebels regularly attacking Central African Republic (C.A.R.), or when one allied country is in war with another (as is Chad–Sudan).

The Central African Armed Forces cannot–even with the support of France and the Multinational Force of the Economic and Monetary Community of Central Africa (FOMUC)–exert control over its own borders. Hence, armed groups are regularly entering the country from Chad and Sudan. The President said in an interview that he has a good relation with neighbours and fellow CEMAC countries, "put aside the incident with Sudan when the border had to be closed since militia entered C.A.R. territory".

Participation in international organisations 
The Central African Republic is an active member in several Central African organizations, including the Economic and Monetary Union (CEMAC), the Economic Community of Central African States (CEEAC), the Central African Peace and Security Council (COPAX- still under formation), and the Central Bank of Central African States (BEAC). Standardization of tax, customs, and security arrangements between the Central African states is a major foreign policy objective of the C.A.R. Government. The C.A.R. is a participant in the Community of Sahel–Saharan States (CEN-SAD), and the African Union (AU).

Other multilateral organizations—including the World Bank, International Monetary Fund, United Nations agencies, European Union, and the African Development Bank—and bilateral donors—including Germany, Japan, the European Union, and the United States—are significant development partners for the C.A.R.

Bilateral relations 
Nineteen countries have resident diplomatic representatives in Bangui, and the C.A.R. maintains approximately the same number of missions abroad. Since early 1989 the government recognizes both Israel and the State of Palestine. The C.A.R. also maintains diplomatic relations with the People's Republic of China. The C.A.R. generally joins other African and developing country states in consensus positions on major policy issues. The most important countries the C.A.R. maintains bilateral relations include the following.

Non-bilateral relations
 Central African Republic–China relations
 Central African Republic–India relations

See also
 List of diplomatic missions in the Central African Republic
 List of diplomatic missions of the Central African Republic

Notes

References 

 
Government of the Central African Republic
Politics of the Central African Republic